Lars Kristian Abrahamsen (18 October 1855 – 21 July 1921) was a Norwegian politician for the Liberal Party. A district stipendiary magistrate by profession, he served in Gunnar Knudsen's first and second cabinets (1908–1910 and 1913–1920). He was Minister of Trade 1908–1910, Minister of Justice 1913–1916, and Minister of Social Affairs 1916–1919. Abrahamsen resigned on 20 February 1919.

References

1855 births
1921 deaths
Government ministers of Norway
Ministers of Justice of Norway
Ministers of Trade and Shipping of Norway